The Burchfield Penney Art Center, or just the Burchfield Penney, is an arts and educational institution part of Buffalo State College, located adjacent to the main campus in Buffalo, New York, United States. Dedicated to the art and vision of American painter Charles E. Burchfield, it was founded in 1966 as the Charles E. Burchfield Center. The center features a museum, library, and activity space for the arts. It maintains the world's largest collection of Burchfield's work, as well as many other distinguished artists of Buffalo, Niagara and Western New York. It is engaged with every aspect of Buffalo and the region's rich cultural activity.

History
Originally named the Charles E. Burchfield Center, the museum held its official opening ceremonies on 9 December 1966 in Rockwell Hall, with Burchfield himself in attendance. Burchfield died just a month and a day after the museum's inauguration.

The Burchfield Penney opened in its new location on November 22, 2008, with a 31-hour non-stop grand opening event. The new  museum is designed by Gwathmey Siegel & Associates Architects.

Today, one of the Burchfield Penney's main goals is to be unique and inviting to the public. Its "Front Yard" exhibit features three tall steel projectors which project constantly-changing artwork onto the exterior of the building. According to Buffalo News critic Colin Dabkowski, "The Front Yard thwarts immediate judgement because it is always in a state of becoming something else." (para. 16). The museum continually connects to educational institutions, specifically Buffalo State College.

Collection
The museum's permanent collection spans the late 19th century through today. The collection includes the world's largest collection of Burchfield's works, as well as a large archive of his drawings, notes and journals. Although the museum focuses on the work of Burchfield, it is the only museum dedicated completely to the art and artists of Buffalo, and features more than 18 exhibitions each year.

Other components of the collection range from traditional mid-nineteenth century work to contemporary media arts.  Notable artists in the collection also include Claire Shuttleworth, Virginia_Cuthbert, Charles Cary Rumsey, Steina Vasulka, Paul Sharits, Ruth Erb Hoffman, and many others. It also includes work by Hallwalls founders: Charles Clough, Robert Longo, Diane Bertolo, Nancy Dwyer, Cindy Sherman, and Michael Zwack. The collection also includes one of the world's largest collections of the documentary photographer Milton Rogovin, paintings and prints by J.J. Lankes (who was a native of Buffalo), and work by Arts and Craft artisans from Roycroft.

See also
List of single-artist museums

References

External links
 

1966 establishments in New York (state)
Museums in Buffalo, New York
Art museums and galleries in New York (state)
Biographical museums in New York (state)
University art museums and galleries in New York (state)
Buffalo State College
Charles Burchfield
Museums of American art